The Asia/Oceania Zone was one of the three zones of the regional Davis Cup competition in 1998.

In the Asia/Oceania Zone there were four different tiers, called groups, in which teams competed against each other to advance to the upper tier. The top two teams in Group IV advanced to the Asia/Oceania Zone Group III in 1999. All other teams remained in Group IV.

Participating nations

Draw
 Venue: National Complex, Ramna Park, Dhaka, Bangladesh
 Date: 9–15 February

  and  promoted to Group III in 1999.

Results

Bangladesh vs. Oman

Bahrain vs. United Arab Emirates

Brunei vs. Iraq

Bangladesh vs. United Arab Emirates

Bahrain vs. Oman

Brunei vs. Jordan

Bangladesh vs. Jordan

Bahrain vs. Iraq

Brunei vs. United Arab Emirates

Bahrain vs. Brunei

Iraq vs. United Arab Emirates

Jordan vs. Oman

Bangladesh vs. Brunei

Iraq vs. Oman

Jordan vs. United Arab Emirates

Bangladesh vs. Iraq

Bahrain vs. Jordan

Brunei vs. Oman

Bangladesh vs. Bahrain

Iraq vs. Jordan

Oman vs. United Arab Emirates

References

External links
Davis Cup official website

Davis Cup Asia/Oceania Zone
Asia Oceania Zone Group IV